A number of ships were named Baltic Ferry, including:

, a former Landing Ship, Tank
, a ferry that was requisitioned during the Falklands Campaign